Miss Earth Austria is a national Beauty pageant in Austria which was founded in 2011. It is responsible for selecting the country's representative to Miss Earth, which is an annual international beauty pageant promoting environmental awareness. Miss Earth Austria also tackles environmental and humanitarian issues and serves to promote environmental awareness and social thinking.

In 2019 Melanie Gassner Kleinitzer  became Miss Earth Austria National Director. She is also the 2019's titleholder.

Titleholders

Color key

See also
 Miss Earth
 Miss Austria

External links
Miss Earth Official Website

References

Beauty pageants in Austria
Austrian awards